In fluid dynamics and invariant theory, a Reynolds operator is a mathematical operator given by averaging something over a group action, satisfying a set of properties called Reynolds rules. In fluid dynamics Reynolds operators are often encountered in models of turbulent flows, particularly the Reynolds-averaged Navier–Stokes equations, where the average is typically taken over the fluid flow under the group of time translations. In invariant theory the average is often taken over a compact group or reductive algebraic group acting on a commutative algebra, such as a ring of polynomials.

Definition
Reynolds operators are used in fluid dynamics, functional analysis, and invariant theory, and the notation and definitions in these areas differ slightly.
Reynolds operators are usually linear operators acting on some algebra of functions, satisfying the identity

 

and sometimes some other conditions, such as commuting with various group actions.

Invariant theory
In invariant theory a Reynolds operator R is usually a linear operator satisfying

 

and

Together these conditions imply that R is idempotent: R2 = R. The Reynolds operator will also usually commute with some group action, and project onto the invariant elements of this group action.

Functional analysis
In functional analysis a Reynolds operator is a linear operator R acting on some algebra of functions φ, satisfying the Reynolds identity
 

The operator R is called an averaging operator if it is linear and satisfies

 

If R(R(φ)) = R(φ) for all φ then R is an averaging operator if and only if it is a Reynolds operator. Sometimes the R(R(φ)) = R(φ) condition is added to the definition of Reynolds operators.

Fluid dynamics 
Let  and  be two random variables, and  be an arbitrary constant.  Then the properties satisfied by Reynolds operators, for an operator  include linearity and the averaging property:

 which implies 
In addition the Reynolds operator is often assumed to commute with space and time translations:

Any operator satisfying these properties is a Reynolds operator.

Examples
Reynolds operators  are often given by projecting onto an invariant subspace of a group action.

Here the group action is given by the action of the group of time-translations.
Suppose that G is a reductive algebraic group or a compact group, and V is a finite-dimensional representation of G. Then G also acts on the symmetric algebra SV of polynomials.  The Reynolds operator R is the G-invariant projection from SV to the subring SVG of elements fixed by G.

References 

 Reprints several of Rota's papers on Reynolds operators, with commentary.

Invariant theory
Fluid dynamics
Turbulence